Sibusiso Camagu Thokozani "S'bura" Sithole (born 14 June 1990) is a South African rugby union player. He plays as a winger or centre for the Niort rugby club in the Federale 1. It was announced that he had joined Getxo rugby club in Spain as a medical joker for the upcoming season

Representative rugby

In 2013, Sithole was included in the squad for the 2013 Rugby World Cup Sevens.

In May 2014, Sithole was one of eight uncapped players that were called up to a Springbok training camp prior to the 2014 mid-year rugby union tests.

References

External links
 
 
 
 Blitzbokke Profile

1990 births
Living people
Xhosa people
South African rugby union players
Sharks (Currie Cup) players
Sharks (rugby union) players
Rugby union wings
Rugby union centres
People from Queenstown, South Africa
South Africa international rugby sevens players
South Africa Under-20 international rugby union players
Rugby sevens players at the 2010 Commonwealth Games
Commonwealth Games bronze medallists for South Africa
Commonwealth Games rugby sevens players of South Africa
Commonwealth Games medallists in rugby sevens
Southern Kings players
Alumni of Queen's College Boys' High School
Medallists at the 2010 Commonwealth Games